Strike Force is an American action-adventure/police procedural television series that aired on ABC during the 1981–1982 television season, and was produced by Aaron Spelling Productions. The program starred Robert Stack as Capt. Frank Murphy, the leader of a specialized unit of detectives and police officers whose job is to stop violent criminals at any cost (usually with a hail of gunfire).

Overview 
Mixing elements of Stack's classic television series The Untouchables from 20 years earlier with doses of Mission: Impossible and Dirty Harry, Strike Force immediately provoked controversy over its violence – at one point the series was labeled the most violent in American TV history. The series attempted to balance the violence by interjecting liberal amounts of humor into its regular characters and focusing on the detectives' personal lives.

Music 
Composers (incomplete listing):  
 Dominic Frontiere (1.1, and series theme)
 John E. Davis
 Allyn Ferguson
 Mark Snow
 Nelson Riddle (1.15)

Cast
 Series star Robert Stack's character, SCPD Det. Capt. Frank Murphy, is the head of the special Strike Force unit. He is a tough,  incorruptible cop, tenacious and efficient on the job, but whose personal life is as unkempt as the home he lives in. He is a recent divorcé who is stuck with a house that was painted pink by his ex-wife, Eve, (who left him for a career in show business, but whom he still obviously loves dearly), where he lives with Sam, his scruffy, oversized, beer-drinking dog (whose main source of nutrition appears to be a brand of dog food labeled "Doggone It"). He is as tough as nails, but caring and fair, and loyal to the people under his command. Capt. Murphy's favorite food is chili dogs (which he seems to "require" everyone on his team of "Strike Force" detectives to eat); his constant nemesis is the squad room soda machine, which seems to work for everyone in the precinct but him, and is a running joke in the series.
 Det. Sgt. Paul Strobber, played by Dorian Harewood, is the only married member of the team, and the most serious; a loving family man, with a wife and young son, but easily the most fearless and dangerous Strike Force member on the street. He is like a coiled spring, ready to strike when provoked, as he does when his family is threatened by white supremacists in the episode "The Outcasts". He likes to wear turtleneck sweaters instead of ties, and hates Murphy's chili dog diet, refusing to share in it.
 Det. Sgt. Rosie Johnson, played by former Australian teen singing star Trisha Noble, is tough, curvaceous, and beautiful — and very much a lady. She became a police officer after her husband went missing in Vietnam and enjoys making — and-deflecting — jokes about her bust size. She is crazy about Gunzer, and often tries to get him to notice her.
 Det. Lt. Charlie Gunzer, played by Richard Romanus, is the group's free-spending ladies' man, with a dry, wicked sense of humor, who Rosie likes, but is afraid to tell him. Gunzer likes fast cars (in one episode, he buys a Mercedes SL sports car), and faster women, and looks upon the chaste Rosie as nothing more than a friend and colleague.
 Det. Sgt. Mark Osborne, played by Michael Goodwin, is the youngest member of the team, and clearly the most "normal" in this dynamic, dysfunctional group. Called "The Kid" by Gunzer, he is a dedicated police officer whose favorite food is chocolate chip cookies. He likes Rosie, and has asked her out at least once, but to no avail.
 Deputy Police Commissioner Herbert Klein, as played by Herb Edelman, is Strike Force's immediate superior, and a close personal friend to Capt. Murphy. A dedicated cop and family man, Herb was cited several times for valor in his early career, but seems to have lost his taste for the violence in the streets, and now is content simply to stay behind a desk and wait out his time until retirement. He is also an amateur author, who often asks Murphy his opinion on the novels he writes — which never seem to get published.

Guest stars
Notable guest stars during the series run included:
 Eric Braeden, best known for his roles as Victor Newman on the soap opera The Young and the Restless, and as Hans Dietrich in the 1960s TV series The Rat Patrol, guest-starred in the episode "The John Killers".
 Paul Brinegar, known for his co-starring roles in T.V. series such as Rawhide, Wyatt Earp, and the Clint Eastwood film High Plains Drifter, guest-starred in the episode "Fallen Angel".
 Joanna Cassidy guest-starred as Frank's ex-wife, Eve Murphy, in the episode "Turnabout" (which probably would have been a recurring role had the series continued).
 Christopher Connelly, best known for the ABC series Peyton Place, guest-starred in the episode "Death Fare".
 Billy Drago, who would go on to play Frank Nitti in the feature film version of Stack's TV series, The Untouchables, played a killer in the 90-minute Strike Force pilot.
 Laurence Fishburne, future star of CSI: Crime Scene Investigation, The Matrix and its sequels (as Morpheus), and Academy Award nominee for What's Love Got to Do With It, guest-starred in the episode "Humiliation".
 Richard Herd, best known in the science fiction community for his role in the 1983 NBC miniseries V and the 1984 sequel V: The Final Battle, as John, the Visitors' Supreme Commander, and on Star Trek: Voyager as Admiral Owen Paris, the father of Tom Paris, guest-starred in the episode "Kidnap".
 Tab Hunter played a killer in the episode "Night Nurse".
 David McCallum, best known for his co-starring roles in The Man from U.N.C.L.E. and NCIS, played an international hit man with a long-standing grudge against Murphy in the episode "ICE".
 Sam Melville, who co-starred in another Aaron Spelling cop series, The Rookies, guest-starred in the episode "Internal Affair".
 Lynne Moody played twin sisters in the episode "The Victims".
 Jeanette Nolan guest-starred in the episode "Sharks".
 Paul Picerni, who played Stack's second-in-command, Agt. Lee Hobson, in The Untouchables, played a doctor in the episode "The John Killers".
 Raymond St. Jacques also guest-starred in the episode "Turnabout" as an FBI agent.
 Elizabeth Stack, Robert Stack's real-life daughter, appeared in the episode "Lonely Ladies".
 Don Stroud played a mobster out to kill Murphy in the episode "Turnabout".
 Philip Michael Thomas, future star of Miami Vice, guest-starred in the episode "The Victims".

Episodes

Reception 
Although initially popular, the novelty of the series quickly wore off; only 19 episodes were produced, plus the 90-minute pilot. According to Todd Gitlin's 1983 book Inside Prime Time, Strike Force finished a dismal 76 out of 105 shows in the Nielsen ratings for the 1981–82 season.

Another factor in the series' demise was the competition: ABC pitted Strike Force against the successful CBS soap-opera Falcon Crest, which had, as its lead-in, the then-number one show on television, Dallas.

Home media 
The first episode of Strike Force was released on video in North America in the late 1980s.

As of 2018, there has been no official DVD release of this series, though there have been several requests for its release, and bootleg copies have circulated in the "collectors market" for the last three decades since Strike Force's cancellation.

References

External links
 
 Strike Force pilot opening sequence (1981) with guest star Billy Drago- YouTube video
 "Strike Force" episode guide-from The Classic TV Archive
 YouTube Video: Strike Force episode # 5 : "Magic Man" (1982)
 Strike Force -ABC promo (1981)
  

1981 American television series debuts
1982 American television series endings
American Broadcasting Company original programming
1980s American crime television series
Television series by CBS Studios
English-language television shows
Television series by Spelling Television
American detective television series
Television shows set in Los Angeles